"Skip to the End" is the first single from The Futureheads's second album News and Tributes. It was released on 22 May 2006 in the United Kingdom. It was voted as the top video in the week commencing 1 May 2006 in the NME Video Chart featured on MTV2

Four versions of the single have been released, three of which are 7" vinyl records. Each of these versions contain a unique B-side. The single charted at #24 in the UK Singles Chart.

Track listing
CD
 "Skip to the End"
 "Easy For Us"

7" #1
 "Skip to the End"
 "History Itself"

7" #2
 "Skip to the End"
 "Last Time Ever"

7" Picture Disc
 "Skip to the End"
 "History Itself"

The Futureheads songs
2006 singles
679 Artists singles
2005 songs
Songs written by Ross Millard